The Barber and the Farmer is an 1897 French short silent film by Georges Méliès. It was sold by Méliès's Star Film Company and is numbered 121 in its catalogues.

Long presumed lost, a single deteriorated copy of the film was discovered in the late twentieth century, near Paris. The film reel had congealed to the point where the images were stuck together, and two attempts to restore it to a viewable state using chemicals failed. In 2006, the French restoration studio Lobster Films collaborated with a London film laboratory on a restoration incorporating digital techniques. The restoration premiered that year at the Pordenone Silent Film Festival.

References

External links
 

French black-and-white films
Films directed by Georges Méliès
French silent short films
1897 short films